Just Jenn Productions is an American television production company founded by Jennifer Graziano. It handles the reality television shows produced by The Weinstein Company.  Graziano is the daughter of New York City mobster and Bonanno crime family consigliere Anthony Graziano, and the sister of Mob Wives reality star Renee Graziano.

Productions
Big Ang (2012)
Miami Monkey (2013)
Mob Wives  (2011-2016)
Mob Wives Chicago (2012)
Mob Wives: The Sit Down (2012)

References

External links
 

Film distributors of the United States
Television production companies of the United States
The Weinstein Company
Companies based in New York City
Entertainment companies established in 2005

de:The Weinstein Company
el:The Weinstein Company
es:The Weinstein Company
fr:The Weinstein Company